An alcalde mayor was a regional magistrate in Spain and its territories from, at least, the 14th century to the 19th century. These regional officials had judicial, administrative, military and legislative authority. Their judicial and administrative functions superseded those of an alcalde. Their area of territorial jurisdiction was called an alcaldía mayor. Judicial appeals from the decisions of an alcalde mayor were heard by an audiencia.

In New Spain (Mexico), alcaldes mayores were chief administrators in colonial-era administrative territories termed alcaldías mayores; in colonial-era Peru the units were called corregimientos.

See also 
 Alcalde ordinario
 Presidente municipal
 Mayor
 Sargento mayor
 Corregidor
 Cabildo
 Regidor
 Síndico
 Ayuntamiento
 Teniente a guerra
 Corregimiento
 Alcalde de la Santa Hermandad

References

Further ereading 
 Corominas, Joan and José A Pascual. Diccionario crítico etimológico castellano e hispánico, 7 vols. Madrid, Editorial Gredos, 1981. 
 Haring, C. H., The Spanish Empire in America. New York, Oxford University Press, 1947.
 O'Callaghan, Joseph F. A History of Medieval Spain. Ithaca, Cornell University Press, 1975. 

Spanish words and phrases
Heads of local government